Juan-Claude Roos (born 12 September 1990) is a former South African rugby union player that usually played as a fly-half.

He was a member of the Pumas side that won the Vodacom Cup for the first time in 2015, beating  24–7 in the final. Roos appeared in all ten matches and contributed 118 points, finishing the tournament as the top scorer.

He joined the Port Elizabeth-based  for the 2016 season, but after financial problems at the Kings, he made the move to Japan to join the Canon Eagles in January 2016.

He retired in 2018 to concentrate on his online personal training company, Activate Me.

References

External links

itsrugby.co.uk profile

Living people
1990 births
South African rugby union players
Rugby union fly-halves
Pumas (Currie Cup) players
Blue Bulls players
People from Witbank
Yokohama Canon Eagles players
South African expatriate rugby union players
Expatriate rugby union players in Japan
South African expatriate sportspeople in Japan
Southern Kings players
Rugby union players from Mpumalanga